The Starlite Music Theatre was a 3,000-capacity theatre in the round located in the Latham area of the Town of Colonie. Also known as the Latham Coliseum, it opened as the Colonie Coliseum in 1958 with a production of the classic musical Damn Yankees, and was demolished in 2012. Some of the big-name acts that performed at the venue include Diana Ross, Rodney Dangerfield, Eddie Murphy, Three Dog Night, Pat Benatar, America, "Weird Al" Yankovic, B.B. King, Bob Hope, Little Richard, Howie Mandel, Gallagher, The Beach Boys, Harry Chapin, and Kenny Rogers.

The Starlite property is located at 625 Columbia Street Extension (NY 9R), west of the city of Cohoes, and just east of 9R's southern junction with US 9 & I-87.
After its 2012 demolition, it was revealed that the site would be redeveloped into a headquarters for Ayco, a subsidiary of Goldman Sachs. Once completed, the new HQ will house over 800 employees.

References

Former music venues in New York (state)
1958 establishments in New York (state)
2012 disestablishments in New York (state)
Buildings and structures in Albany County, New York
Demolished buildings and structures in New York (state)
Buildings and structures demolished in 2012